Marian Kondratowicz (10 December 1941 – 8 January 2021) was a Polish professional association football goalkeeper. Between the years 1963 and 1970 he made 25 appearances in the top division with Odra Opole.

References

External links
90minut.pl profile

1941 births
2021 deaths
Polish footballers
Odra Opole players
Association football goalkeepers